The Coihaique Group is a group of geological formations in northwestern Patagonia. From top to bottom the formations that make the group are Apeleg, Katterfeld and Toqui. The contact between the formations of the group are diachronous with Katterfeld Formation interfingering with the formations on top and below it. The lower and upper boundaries of the group are unconformities formed by erosion. The older parts of Coihaique Group represent a marine transgression while the younger parts evidences a return to non-marine conditions.

Fossils in Toqui Formation 
The rock formation preserves fossils from the Late Jurassic period of the Mesozoic Era.

Fossils of Chilesaurus (147 Ma) were found in the Aysén Region of Patagonia. It is an extinct genus of theropods in the family Tetanurae. The fossil record also comprises a sauropod Titanosaur, a Camarasaur and a Diplodocid.

See also 
 
 Geology of Chile
 Tobífera Formation

References 

Geologic groups of South America
Geologic formations of Chile
Jurassic System of South America
Late Jurassic South America
Jurassic Chile
Lower Cretaceous Series of South America
Cretaceous Chile
Shale formations
Sandstone formations
Groups
Paleontology in Chile
Geology of Aysén Region